Ecuador is a country in South America. The country's largest exports are oil and agricultural products such as bananas and seafood. The COVID-19 pandemic in Ecuador and declining oil prices have greatly strained the business environment.

For further information on the types of business entities in this country and their abbreviations, see "Business entities in Ecuador".

Notable firms 
This list includes notable companies with primary headquarters located in the country. The industry and sector follow the Industry Classification Benchmark taxonomy. Organizations which have ceased operations are included and noted as defunct.

See also 
 List of airlines of Ecuador
 List of banks in Ecuador

References 

Companies of Ecuador
Ecuador